On 22 July 2016, an Antonov An-32 twin engine turboprop transport aircraft of the Indian Air Force disappeared while flying over the Bay of Bengal. The aircraft was en route from Tambaram Air Force Station in the city of Chennai on the western coastline of the Bay of Bengal to Port Blair in the Andaman and Nicobar Islands. There were 29 people on board. The search and rescue operation became India's largest search operation for a missing plane on the sea in history. There were also similar incidents in 1986 and 2019.

Passengers
There were 29 people on board the aircraft: six crew members; 11 Indian Air Force personnel; two Indian Army soldiers; one each from the Indian Navy and Indian Coast Guard; and eight defence civilians working with Naval Armament Depot (NAD). The civilians were from Visakhapatnam in Andhra Pradesh.

Disappearance and search

The Antonov An-32 took off from Tambaram Air Force Station, Chennai at 08:30 local time on 22 July 2016. It was expected to land in Port Blair around 11:45 local time. The Indian Navy and the Indian Coast Guard launched a large search and rescue operation, using a submarine, 12 surface vessels and five aircraft.

On the third day after the disappearance, 16 ships, a submarine and six aircraft were deployed to search for the missing An-32 in the Bay of Bengal, about 150 nautical miles east of Chennai. On 1 August, it was confirmed that the aircraft had no underwater locator beacon (ULB). It did have two emergency locator transmitters (ELTs).

On 15 September 2016, the search and rescue mission was called off; all 29 people on board were presumed dead and their families were notified.

See also
 List of missing aircraft
 1986 Indian Air Force An-32 disappearance
 2019 Indian Air Force An-32 crash

References

External links
 

2016 disasters in India
Missing aircraft
History of the Indian Ocean
Accidents and incidents involving the Antonov An-32
Aviation accidents and incidents in 2016
Aviation accidents and incidents in India
Indian Air Force An-32